The Man of the Hour is a 1914 American silent drama film directed by Maurice Tourneur and starring Robert Warwick, Alec B. Francis, and Ned Burton.

Cast
 Robert Warwick as Henry Garrison  
 Alec B. Francis as George Garrison  
 Ned Burton as Richard Horrigan  
 Eric Mayne as Charles Wainwright  
 Johnny Hines as Perry Carter Wainwright  
 Belle Adair as Dallas Wainwright  
 Chester Barnett as Joe Standing  
 Thomas Jackson as Sheriff Smith 
 Bert Starkey as Graham, sneak thief  
 Charles Dungan as Mayor's doorkeeper

References

Bibliography
 Waldman, Harry. Maurice Tourneur: The Life and Films. McFarland, 2001.

External links

1914 films
1914 drama films
Silent American drama films
Films directed by Maurice Tourneur
American silent feature films
1910s English-language films
American black-and-white films
1910s American films